The 1964 New York Mets season was the third regular season for the Mets. They went 53–109 and finished 10th in the NL, 40 games behind the World Series Champion St. Louis Cardinals. They were managed by Casey Stengel. They played home games at Shea Stadium, which opened on April 17 of that year.

Offseason 
 October 10, 1963: Jack Fisher was drafted by the Mets from the San Francisco Giants in a 1963 special draft.

Regular season 
One high point of Shea Stadium's first season came on Father's Day, when Philadelphia Phillies pitcher Jim Bunning threw a perfect game against the Mets, the first in the National League since 1880. For perhaps the only time in the stadium's history, the Shea faithful found themselves rooting for the visitors, caught up in the rare achievement, and roaring for Bunning on every pitch in the ninth inning. His strikeout of John Stephenson capped the performance.

Another high point was Shea Stadium's hosting of the All-Star Game. Johnny Callison's ninth-inning three-run home run off Dick Radatz capped a four-run rally and gave the National League a 7–4 win over the American League in that game, which evened the series at seventeen wins for each league.

The stadium also saw pitcher Masanori Murakami of the San Francisco Giants  become the first Japanese player to appear in the Major Leagues. He 
entered the game in the ninth inning of the Giants' 4–1 loss to the Mets

Unexpectedly thrust into the spotlight in the final hectic weekend of the 1964 season, the Mets relished the role of spoiler, beating the Cardinals in St. Louis on Friday and Saturday (keeping alive the hopes of the Phillies, Giants, and Reds) before succumbing to the eventual National League champions on Sunday.

Season standings

Record vs. opponents

Notable transactions 
 April 6, 1964: Darrell Sutherland was selected off waivers by the Mets from the Philadelphia Phillies as a first-year waiver pick.
 April 23, 1964: Chico Fernández, Bobby Catton (minors), and cash were traded by the Mets to the Chicago White Sox for Charley Smith.
 August 7, 1964: Frank Thomas was traded by the Mets to the Philadelphia Phillies for Wayne Graham, Gary Kroll, and cash.
 August 8, 1964: Frank Lary was traded by the Mets to the Milwaukee Braves for Dennis Ribant and cash.
 August 27, 1964: Jerry Koosman was signed as an amateur free agent by the Mets.

Shea Stadium 
The Mets' new home park was originally to be called "Flushing Meadows Stadium" – the name of the public park on which it was built – but a movement was launched to name it in honor of William A. Shea, the man who brought National League baseball back to New York. After 29 months and $28.5 million, Shea Stadium opened on April 17, 1964, with the Mets losing to the Pittsburgh Pirates, led by Roberto Clemente and Bill Mazeroski, 4–3 before a crowd of 50,312. Shea was a circular stadium, with the grandstand forming a perfect circle around the field and ending a short distance beyond the foul lines. The remainder of the perimeter was mostly empty space beyond the outfield fences. This space was occupied by the bullpens, the scoreboard, and the centerfield "batter's eye" backdrop. The stadium boasted 54 restrooms, 21 escalators and seats for 57,343. It was big, airy, sparkling, with a massive 86' x 175' scoreboard. Also, rather than the standard light towers, Shea had lamps along its upper reaches, like a convoy of semis with their brights on, which gave the field that unique high-wattage glow. Praised for its convenience, even its elegance, Shea was deemed a showplace.

Roster

Player stats

Batting

Starters by position 
Note: Pos = Position; G = Games played; AB = At bats; H = Hits; Avg. = Batting average; HR = Home runs; RBI = Runs batted in

Other batters 
Note: G = Games played; AB = At bats; H = Hits; Avg. = Batting average; HR = Home runs; RBI = Runs batted in

Pitching

Starting pitchers 
Note: G = Games pitched; IP = Innings pitched; W = Wins; L = Losses; ERA = Earned run average; SO = Strikeouts

Other pitchers 
Note: G = Games pitched; IP = Innings pitched; W = Wins; L = Losses; ERA = Earned run average; SO = Strikeouts

Relief pitchers 
Note: G = Games pitched; W = Wins; L = Losses; SV = Saves; ERA = Earned run average; SO = Strikeouts

Farm system 

LEAGUE CHAMPIONS: Auburn

Notes

References 
1964 New York Mets at Baseball Reference
1964 New York Mets team page at www.baseball-almanac.com

New York Mets seasons
New York Mets season
New York Mets
1960s in Queens